Lachlan Pendragon is a Brisbane-based Australian animator, best known for stop-motion animated film An Ostrich Told Me the World Is Fake and I Think I Believe It.

Career
In 2021, Pendragon wrote and directed the stop-motion animated short film An Ostrich Told Me the World Is Fake and I Think I Believe It. In an interview with "Novastream Network," he mentioned that it took ten months to develop the film, which he did as a research project for his doctorate program at Griffith Film School. The film received several nominations including Berlin International Film Festival, Annecy International Animation Film Festival, and others. It was honored at the Student Academy Awards in 2022. It was nominated for the Best Animated Short Academy Award in 2023.

Filmography
 2015 - Bush Turkeys of QCA
 2015 - Elevator Madness
 2017 - The Toll
 2019 - Beethoven: live at Roma Street Parkland
 2021 - An Ostrich Told Me the World Is Fake and I Think I Believe It

References

External links
Lachlan Pendragon at the IMDb

Living people
Australian animators